Tambankulu Airfield  is an airstrip serving Tambankulu, in Eswatini.

See also

Transport in Eswatini
List of airports in Eswatini

References

External links
 OurAirports - Tambankulu
 FallingRain - Tambankulu
 Google Earth

Airports in Eswatini